Road of Hell (Spanish: Camino del infierno) is a 1931 American drama film directed by Richard Harlan and starring Juan Torena, Maria Alba and Carlos Villarías. It is the Spanish-language version of Fox Film's The Man Who Came Back (1931) based upon the play by Jules Eckert Goodman, which was in turn adapted from the novel by John Fleming Wilson. Such Multiple-language versions were common in the early years of sound film.

Cast
Juan Torena as Esteban Randolf  
Maria Alba as Angela  
Carlos Villarías as Tomás Randolf  
Ralph Navarro as Traves / Detective Harrison  
Carmen Rodríguez as Tia Isabel 
Lucio Villegas as Carlos Resling  
Juan Aristi Eulate as Capt. Garlon  
Ramón Peón 
Virginia Ruiz

References

External links

1931 drama films
American drama films
Films directed by Richard Harlan
Fox Film films
American black-and-white films
Spanish-language American films
1930s Spanish-language films
1930s American films